Amber or Amer, is a city near Jaipur city in Jaipur district in the Indian state of Rajasthan. It is now a part of the Jaipur Municipal Corporation.

The picturesque situation of Amber at the mouth of a rocky mountain gorge, in which nestles a lake, has attracted the admiration of travellers, including Victor Jacquemont and Reginald Heber. It is seen to be a remarkable example for its combined Rajput-Mughal architecture. The Amber Fort, a UNESCO World Heritage Site, is the top tourist attraction in the Jaipur area.

History
Amber was a Meena state that replaced Khoh as the capital of Dhundhar after Kakil Deo, the son of Dulherai, defeated the Meenas.

The state of Jaipur was earlier known as Amber or Dhundhar and was controlled by Meena chiefs of five different tribes who were under suzerainty of the Bargurjar Rajput Raja of Deoti. Later a Kachhwaha prince Dulha Rai destroyed the sovereignty of Meenas and also defeated Bargurjars of Deoli and took Dhundhar fully under  Kachwaha rule.

Much of the present structure known as Amber Fort is actually the palace built by Mughal Emperor Akbar's Navaratnas Raja Man Singh I who ruled from 1590 to 1614 AD. The palace includes several spectacular buildings, such as the Diwan-i-Khas, and the elaborately painted Ganesh Pole built by the renowned warlord Mirza Raja Jai Singh I (Man Singh I's grandson).  The old and original fort of Amber, dating from earlier Rajas or the Mair or Maidh period, is what is known in the present day as Jaigarh Fort, which was actually the main defensive structure rather than the palace itself. The two structures are interconnected by a series of encompassing fortifications.

Amber was capital of the Kachwaha until 1727 when the ruler of Amber, Sawai Jai Singh II founded a capital Jainagara (Jaipur), named after him, about nine kilometers south of Amber. After the founding of this new town, the royal palace and houses of prominent persons were shifted to Jaipur. The priests of Shila Devi temple, who were Bengali Brahmins, continued to live in the fort (to this date), while the Jaigarh fort above the palace also remained heavily garrisoned. The capital of Kachwaha was supplanted by the modern city of Jaipur, which is the capital of the Rajasthan state in India.

Controversy over renovation practices
Poor site management and development pressures have dramatically altered the historical integrity of Amber.  The building that rings around the Jaleb Chwok courtyard "has been converted to a market place with shops selling showpieces and dresses. They have cafeterias, cyber cafés, etc.", according to the Times of India. In the summer of 2009, the Rajasthan High Court launched a three-member panel charged with investigating the controversial renovations and determining to what extent the cultural heritage of the site was compromised.

Visitor attractions
Amber Fort
Maota Lake
Jagat shiromani Temple
Jaigarh Fort
Nahargarh Biological Park 
Panna Meena ka Kund stepwell 
Water Gateways

Nahargarh Biological Park
This park is home to species whose numbers have declined over the years, such as the Indian leopard. The flora is representative of the Khathiar-Gir dry deciduous forests ecoregion.

In media 
Various scenes were produced for the 2011 British film The Best Exotic Marigold Hotel in and around Amber.

Gallery

See also
Nahargarh Fort
Rajasthani people
Rajasthan
Ramgarh Dam

References

Further reading

External links 

Cities and towns in Jaipur district
Former capital cities in India
History of Jaipur
Jaipur
Tourist attractions in Jaipur